Roy F. Price (born July 21, 1967) is a former Amazon.com executive who in 2017 resigned over sexual harassment claims. He worked for over 13 years at Amazon, founded Amazon Video and Amazon Studios; is a former Disney executive; and is a former McKinsey consultant. Roy has developed 16 patented technologies, and his developed television series have won 12 Best Series awards from the Golden Globes and Emmys.

Family and education
Price has been described as being from "Hollywood royalty." His mother, Katherine Crawford, was an actress known for Riding with Death (1976), A Walk in the Spring Rain (1970) and Gemini Man (1976). His father, Frank Price, held a number of Hollywood executive positions including head of Universal TV in the 1970s; President, and later Chairman and CEO, of Columbia Pictures; and president of Universal Pictures. His maternal grandfather, Roy Huggins, created and produced TV shows like The Fugitive, The Rockford Files and Maverick.

Price graduated from Phillips Academy Andover and Harvard University, and later attended USC Gould School of Law.

Career
From 1989 to 1990 Price worked as a film set assistant, specifically, "third assistant camera" during the Fiji shooting of Return to the Blue Lagoon (1991). From 1990 to 1992, Price worked as a financial analyst at Allen & Company.

From 1993 to 2000, Price was the Vice President of Creative Affairs for Disney TV Animation. Price developed or supervised TV series including Recess (1997), Pepper Ann (1997), Hercules (1998), Timon & Pumbaa (1995), Buzz Lightyear of Star Command (2000), The Weekenders (2000), and Emmy and BAFTA winner Teacher's Pet (2000). Also, several animated films and direct to videos including Recess: School's Out (2001), Tarzan & Jane and Mickey's House of Villains.

After his time with Disney, Price worked as a consultant for McKinsey from 2000–2002, a global management consulting firm that serves a broad mix of private, public and social sector institutions.

From 2003 to 2004, Price operated out of Price Entertainment (his father's studio established in the late 80s) and acted as a business consultant to media companies.

From 2004 to 2009, Price worked as a Group Product manager, director, and Amazon Video on Demand.  He launched Amazon Video in 2008 and Amazon Studios in 2010. From 2009–2014, Price also worked as Director of Amazon Video on Demand. From 2014–2017, Price was head of Amazon Studios, and VP for Prime Video. 

On October 17, 2017, he resigned his position at Amazon in the wake of allegations of sexual misconduct. About a month after leaving Amazon, Price moved permanently to Hong Kong where he founded an art management and consulting firm called International Art Machine, in November 2017.

Price's career was described as "irreverent, puckish and infinitely bolder than most Hollywood execs".

Sexual harassment allegations

Amazon producer Isa Dick Hackett reported through The Hollywood Reporter on October 12, 2017 that Price, then the programming chief at Amazon, had sexually harassed her at the 2015 San Diego Comic-Con. Hackett stated that Price aggressively asked her for sex in a taxi, which was the first time they had met. Michael Paull, a top executive at Amazon, was in the taxi with them at the time. Later that night, Price allegedly yelled sexual propositions into Hackett's ear while she was in a conversation with other Amazon executives. Hackett also alleged that Price had failed to take action when another actress, Rose McGowan, told him she was sexually assaulted by producer Harvey Weinstein. 

The Information had previously published, on August 25, a report revealing that Amazon had investigated a sexual harassment complaint from Hackett. After The Hollywood Reporter's publication of Hackett's accusations, Amazon suspended Price.

On October 16, 2017, Price's fiancée, Lila Feinberg, announced that she was calling off their wedding. Her dress was designed by Georgina Chapman, the wife of Harvey Weinstein, the latter of whom was similarly involved in sexual harassment claims.

References

21st-century American businesspeople
Amazon (company) people
American computer businesspeople
American technology chief executives
Living people
1967 births
Phillips Academy alumni
Harvard University alumni
USC Gould School of Law alumni